The ZacUP Skyrace del Grignone (also known as Sentiero delle Grigne), is an international skyrunning competition held for the first time in 2013. It runs every year along the mountain path of the Grigna (Italy) in September.

Previously this race, for eleven editions from 2002 to 2012, was called the Sentiero delle Grigne (43km / 3,200m D +), and was the race of the Skyrunner World Series circuit. ZacUP is the heir, shorter and less demanding, still keeping the spirit of the previous, so much to award the Trofeo Scaccabarozzi (the full name of the race was in fact the Trofeo Scaccabarozzi-Sentiero delle Grigne) to transit on the Grand Prize of mountain in the summit of the Grigna (2410 m).

ZacUP Skyrace del Grignone

Sentiero delle Grigne

See also 
 Skyrunner World Series

References

External links 
 Official web site

Skyrunning competitions
Skyrunner World Series
Athletics competitions in Italy
Sport in Lombardy